Callochiton mortenseni is a species of chiton in the family Callochitonidae.

References
 Powell A. W. B., New Zealand Mollusca, William Collins Publishers Ltd, Auckland, New Zealand 1979 

Callochitonidae
Chitons of New Zealand
Molluscs described in 1924